Đỗ Kiếm, writing as Kiem Do (Hanoi, 1933) is a former officer of the Republic of Vietnam Navy, who was serving as Deputy Chief of Staff (Operations) when Saigon fell in 1975. He secretly organised the evacuation of over 30,000 refugees aboard 32 naval ships. Kiem's efforts were ultimately successful, preventing those 32 vessels and everyone aboard from falling into the hands of North Vietnamese forces. After overseeing the disbanding of the crews of the escaped VNN ships, Kiem moved to the United States where he has resided since, having been granted citizenship after requesting political asylum.

Early life
Kiem was born in Hanoi, and by the age of 13 was a scout for the Viet Minh, fighting for Vietnam's independence from French colonial rule. Following the end of the First Indochina War, Kiem was sent to France to be trained at the École Navale in Brest.

Career 
Kiem was the commander of the submarine chaser Van Don (HQ-06) during the 1963 coup. He later served as the Commandant of the Vietnamese Midshipman’s School, Chief of Staff of the Mobile Riverine Force, District Commander of the IV Naval Zone, and Deputy Chief of Staff (Operations).

With the help of Richard L. Armitage, Kiem secretly organised the evacuation of the Republic of Vietnam Navy fleet of 32 ships accompanied by several cargo ships and fishing boats with over 30,000 naval personnel and their families aboard.

After settling in the United States after receiving political asylum, Kiem taught high school math and science, studied in the MBA program at the University of New Orleans, and worked as a cost engineer for the Louisiana utility company Entergy for more than twenty years.

Retirement 
Since retirement in 1997, he has been active as a leader in the New Orleans Vietnamese community and has lectured frequently on the Vietnam War at local universities and before veterans groups. 

Kiem's wartime memoirs, co-authored with Julie Kane, was published in May 1998 and entitled Counterpart: A South Vietnamese Naval Officer's War.

Family 
He and his wife of thirty-nine years Thom Le Do, have five children, and six American-born grandchildren.

References

External links

 The Paracel Islands (Hoang-Sa) Sea Battle by Việt Nam Quốc Dân Đảng

South Vietnamese military personnel of the Vietnam War
Vietnamese anti-communists
American people of Vietnamese descent
Vietnamese politicians
1933 births
Living people
Vietnamese democracy activists